Karolína Plíšková was the defending champion but was no longer eligible to participate in junior tennis. Plíšková competed in the women's singles qualifying competition where she lost to Anna-Lena Grönefeld in the first round.

An-Sophie Mestach won the tournament, defeating Monica Puig in the final, 6–4, 6–2.

Seeds

Draw

Finals

Top half

Section 1

Section 2

Bottom half

Section 3

Section 4

References 
 Main draw

Girls' Singles
Australian Open, 2011 Girls' Singles